Sahadai Buzurg railway station, station code SDG, is a railway station in the Sonpur railway division of East Central Railway. It is located in Sahadai Buzurg block of Vaishali district in the Indian state of Bihar.

Platforms
The three platforms  are interconnected with a foot overbridge  (FOB)from platform no. 1 to platform 3. Ticket counters are available at Platform no 1.

Nearest airports
The nearest airports to Sahadai Buzurg railway station are:
 Gorakhpur Airport, Gorakhpur  
 Gaya Airport 
 Lok Nayak Jayaprakash Airport, Patna 
 Netaji Subhash Chandra Bose International Airport, Kolkata

See also
Shahpur Patori railway station
Chak Sikandar railway station
Desari railway station

References

External links
 Sahadai Buzurg Station Map
 Official website of the Vaishali district

Railway stations in Vaishali district
Sonpur railway division